General elections were held in Azad Kashmir in 1975 to elect the members of second assembly of Azad Kashmir.

References

Elections in Azad Kashmir
1975 elections in Pakistan